Mérindol is a commune in the Vaucluse department in the Provence-Alpes-Côte d'Azur region in southeastern France.

The village, located south of the Luberon massif, has some prominence in the plain of the Durance river which demarcates the Vaucluse and Bouches-du-Rhône departments. This plain has allowed the municipality to develop an agriculture which remains relatively important for its economy. Its history, like that of several other villages in the Luberon, was marked by the French Wars of Religion.

History

Points of interest
 Arboretum du Font de l'Orme
 Massacre of Mérindol

See also
 Côtes du Luberon AOC
Communes of the Vaucluse department
Luberon

References

Communes of Vaucluse